Santos Futebol Clube is a Brazilian professional football club, based in Santos, Brazil. They play in the Campeonato Paulista, São Paulo's state league, and the Campeonato Brasileiro Série A or Brasileirão, Brazil's national league, and are one of the only three clubs to have never been relegated, along with São Paulo and Flamengo. Santos was a founding member of the Clube dos 13 (English: Club of the 13) group of Brazil's leading football clubs.

The club has contributed many players to the Brazil national team, including to Brazil's World Cup-winning teams, especially during the golden generation of players known as Os Santásticos (The Santastics), from 1956 until 1974. Led by Lula, the team won a total of 22 titles between 1959 and 1974, including two Copa Libertadores, the most prestigious laurel in South American football. Os Santásticos dominated the Brazil national football team and had what was considered by some the best club team of all times, and became a symbol of Joga Bonito (English: The Beautiful Game) in football culture, thanks to figures such as Gilmar, Mauro, Mengálvio, Coutinho, Pepe and the iconic Pelé, named the "Athlete of the Century" by the International Olympic Committee, and widely regarded among football historians, former players and fans to be one of the best and most accomplished footballers in the game's history.

Santos contributed players to the victorious Brazil national teams of 1958, 1962 and 1970 FIFA World Cups. It has also contributed players to the winning sides of the 1916, 2004 and 2007 Copa Américas as well as the 2005 and 2013 FIFA Confederations Cup. One Santos player has won the Golden Ball award at the World Cup with Brazil; Pelé in 1970. Neymar replicated Pelé at the Confederations Cup by winning that competition's golden ball. Pinga and Narciso represented Brazil in medal winning squads at the 1984 and 1996 Summer Olympics.

List of call-ups of Santos FC players to the Brazil national teams
Below is a list of all Santos FC players to have played in the main national team (or Seleção in Portuguese language) while representing the club in official matches since 1916.

List of call-ups of Santos FC players to the Brazil national Olympic teams
Below is a list of all Santos FC players to have played in the Brazil national Olympic team in official matches while representing the club.

List of call-ups of Santos FC players to the Brazil national U-20 teams
Below is a list of all Santos FC players to have played in the Brazil national U-20 team in official matches while representing the club.

List of call-ups of Santos FC players to the Brazil national U-17 teams
Below is a list of all Santos FC players to have played in the Brazil national U-17 team in official matches while representing de club.

Footnotes and references

Further reading

See also
 List of Santos FC players
 Brazil national football team
 Brazil national under-23 football team
 Brazil national under-20 football team
 Brazil national under-17 football team
 Football in Brazil
 Brazil national squads in World and South American championships
 List of footballers with 100 or more caps
 FIFA World Cup-winning players

External links
 Brazil on FIFA.com
 

Santos FC
History of the Brazil national football team